Following is a list of Marsiya writers in the Urdu language.

Dakhani School
 Waheed Akhtar (1934–1996), Urdu poet, writer, critic, orator, and one of the leading Muslim scholars and philosophers of the 20th century

Dehlavi School
 Mirza Muhammad Rafi Sauda (1713–1781),
 Khwaja Mir Dard (1721–1785),
 Mir Taqi Mir (1723–1810),

Awadhi School
 Azeem Amrohvi
 Nasim Amrohvi (-1987)
 Kaifi Azmi (1919–2002)
 Mir Babar Ali Anis (1802–1874),
 Mirza Salaamat Ali Dabeer (1803–1875),
 Josh Malihabadi (1898–1982),
 Ali Haider Tabatabai (1854–1933), born 1854 in Awadh, died 1933 in Hyderabad Deccan, India, was a poet, translator and a scholar of languages, Dr.Syed Ali Imam zaidi (Gauhar)Great grand son of Mir Babar Ali Anees.Syed Mustafa Meerza (Rasheed)Maternal grand son of Anees.Syed sajjad Husain (shadeed)

Pakistani School
 Faiz Ahmad Faiz (1911–1984),
 Hilal Naqvi (b.1950)

See also
 Marsiya
 List of Urdu-language poets

References

L
Urdu
Urdu-language poetry
List